Frechiella is an ammonite with a smooth, somewhat globose involute shell that lived during the later part of the Early Jurassic, which has been found in England and Italy. The shell is coiled so that the outer whorls cover most of the inner, leaving the inner whorls only slightly exposed. The outer rim, known as the venter, is broadly arched, with either a low narrow keel bordered by small grooves, or a large median groove.

Frechiella is included in the Hildoceratidae, a family of Jurassic ammonoid cephalopods that are part of the Hildocerataceae.

References
 JsdAmmonites.fr: Ammonites, D − G genera
 Arkell, W. J.: Treatise on Invertebrate Paleontology, Part L, Geological Society of America and University Kansas Press (1957). 
Bécaud, M.: Les Harpoceratinae, Hildoceratinae et Paroniceratinae du Toarcien de la Vendée et des Deux-Sèvres (France). Documents des Laboratoires de Géologie de la Faculté des Sciences de Lyon 162 (2006).
Goy, A., Martínez, G.: Paroniceratinae (Ammonoidea, Hildoceratidae) del Toarciense en las Cordilleras Ibérica y Cantábrica (Espana). Geobios 42 (2009).
Howarth, M. K.: Treatise Online Number 57, Part L, Revised, Volume 3B, Chapter 4: Psiloceratoidea, Eodoceratoidea, Hildoceratoidea. Lawrence, Kansas (2013).
Kovács, Z.: Paroniceratidae (Ammonitina) of the Toarcian from the Gerecse Mts (NE Transdanubian Range, Hungary). — Földtani Közlöny 140/2 (2010).
Lacroix, P.: Les Hildoceratidae du Lias moyen et supérieur des Domaines NW Européen et Téthysien. Une Histoire de Famille. Chirat, St-Just-La-Pendue (2011).
Rulleau, L., Bécaud, M., Neige, P.: Les ammonites traditionnellement regroupées dans la sous-famille des Bouleiceratinae (Hildoceratidae, Toarcien): aspects phylogénétiques, biogéographiques et systématiques. Geobios, 36 (2003).
Venturi, F., Rea, G., Silvestrini, G., Bilotta, M.: Ammonites. A geological journey around the Apennine Mountains. Porzi, Perugia (2010)

Early Jurassic ammonites of Europe
Toarcian life
Early Jurassic genus first appearances
Early Jurassic extinctions